Donata Melina Nicolette "Dina" Lohan (born September 15, 1962) is an American television personality who rose to fame as the mother and manager of actress Lindsay Lohan. She is also the mother of Michael Jr., Aliana and Dakota Lohan.

Early life
Lohan was born and raised in New York City, to John L. and Ann Sullivan. She has two brothers, Matt and Paul. She is of Italian (from her mother) and Irish descent, and was raised Catholic. Lohan is a former singer and dancer.

Career
Lohan and her younger daughter Ali starred in the reality show Living Lohan, which debuted on May 26, 2008 on the cable television network E!. Lohan is also one of the executive producers of the series.

Controversy

Lohan has been the subject of media scrutiny and criticism that claim she is exploiting her daughters Ali and Lindsay Lohan for personal fame.

Lohan's claimed career as a Radio City Rockette has also been questioned, with a spokesperson for Radio City stating there was no record of this and that executives at Cablevision, which owns Radio City, were indignant at the claim.

On August 5, 2008, Anderson Cooper appeared as a guest co-host on the ABC talk show Live with Regis and Kelly, during which he stated, in reference to Living Lohan, "I can't believe I'm wasting a minute of my life watching these horrific people". In an interview with OK! magazine, Dina Lohan responded, "people are just cruel...This is bad karma for him". Cooper did not respond directly to Lohan's comments but clarified that while he felt bad for Ali Lohan, he opined that she should be living the conventional life of a teenager, and not be made to star in a reality television show. Michael Lohan also responded to Cooper's comments, telling Access Hollywood, "I think Anderson Cooper is an opinionated, hypocritical idiot who should be an adult and keep his opinion to himself...He is the last person to judge anyone, when he and his own family have their own issues."

Personal life
In 1985, she married Michael Lohan. The couple briefly separated in 1988, and later reunited. Dina filed for divorce in 2005, and the couple reached a divorce settlement in August 2007, with the divorce scheduled to be finalized three months later. She was granted custody of their two youngest children, Ali and Cody. He had worked as a Wall Street trader and businessman who inherited his father's pasta business and has been in trouble with the law on several occasions. The Lohans have four children: Lindsay (b. 1986), Michael, Jr. (b. 1987), Aliana (b. 1993), and Dakota "Cody" Lohan (b. 1996).

Lohan was arrested for speeding and driving under the influence in Nassau County, Long Island on September 12, 2013, and agreed to a plea deal which included admitting guilt. She was sentenced to 100 hours community service, had her drivers license revoked for one year, and was fined $3,000.

Lohan was arrested for driving under the influence and leaving the scene of an accident in Nassau County on January 11, 2020. CNN reported Lohan also faced "four other charges: operating an unregistered vehicle, operating an uninspected vehicle, driving without a license, and aggravated unlicensed operation of a vehicle in the 3rd degree, the online court records state."

Filmography

References

External links
 Dina Lohan at Internet Movie Database
 Dina Lohan at Living Lohan TV

1962 births
Living people
American women television personalities
American people of Irish descent
American people of Italian descent
Television personalities from New York City
Lohan family
American female dancers
Dancers from New York (state)
American film actresses
People from Merrick, New York